David Lambert (born November 29, 1993) is an American actor. He is best known for playing Brandon Foster on the Freeform original series The Fosters.

Early life 
David Lambert was born in Baton Rouge, Louisiana. His mother is Puerto Rican, while his father is from the mainland United States. He was home-schooled. He has lived in England, Texas, and Taiwan but has been living in Georgia for many years.

He can play the piano and trumpet, and is learning the electric guitar. He also has a very strong tenor singing voice.

He has been doing theater for many years, beginning when he was cast in the play the Wizard of Oz at age 3. His theatrical roles include Mr. Tumnus in The Chronicles of Narnia: The Lion, the Witch, and the Wardrobe, Mr. Mayor in Seussical, Carisford in Little Princess, and Phao in The Jungle Book. He played J.J. for one episode of Psych. He also starred as Jaylen in the television show Tyler Perry's House of Payne.

Career 
Lambert was discovered at an open casting call by agent Joy Pervis in Atlanta. After performing his monologue, he was asked to do something else. At first thought, he recited the Pledge of Allegiance, and it worked. He was in Georgia when he got the call to pack for Canada, where Aaron Stone was filmed.

From 2009 to 2010 Lambert starred as Jason Landers, Charlie Landers/Aaron Stone's brother, in Aaron Stone, and Goose in the Disney Channel original movie Den Brother, also starring Hutch Dano. Lambert starred in the Hallmark Hall of Fame movie A Smile As Big As The Moon, which aired on January 29, 2012.

He had a major role in The Lifeguard, competed at the 2013 Sundance Film Festival for Best Dramatic Film. He plays the love interest of the character played by Kristen Bell, his co-star in the film.

Most recently, he had a starring role on the ABC Family original series, The Fosters. He played Brandon Foster, a talented, 16-year-old pianist who is the biological son of cop Stef Adams Foster.

Personal life
Lambert is of Irish, English, German, French and Puerto Rican descent. His mother has stated that his birth year as reported on most websites (1992) is incorrect, and that Lambert was born on November 29, 1993.

Filmography

Awards

References

External links
 
 

1993 births
Living people
21st-century American male actors
American male child actors
American male film actors
American people of Puerto Rican descent
American male television actors
Male actors from Baton Rouge, Louisiana